Klyzhovo is a rural locality (a village) in Vysokovskoye Rural Settlement, Ust-Kubinsky  District, Vologda Oblast, Russia. The population was 3 as of 2002.

Geography 
Klyzhovo is located 28 km southeast of Ustye (the district's administrative centre) by road. Kochevatik is the nearest rural locality.

References 

Rural localities in Tarnogsky District